The Liberal Egyptian Party, formerly Mother Egypt Party, was a liberal and secular political party in Egypt advocating democracy and patriotism. This liberal party was a political party in Egypt until the merger with another liberal party, the Egyptian Democratic Party, to become the Egyptian Social Democratic Party on 29 March 2011.

The party built on previous attempts by native anti-colonial activists in the early 20th century to re-assert ethnic Egyptian identity, based in part on national independence from the British and the Ottomans, the establishment of a secular and democratic national government, and the formalization of the local language. It also sought to revive the indigenous Egyptian language and to disassociate Egypt from the Arab nationalist policies introduced by Gamal Abdel Nasser. The Liberal Egyptian Party called for separating religion from politics and most civil affairs. The party also called for capitalism and reducing the influence of the public sector in the economy. In its early history it called for full normalization with Israel, though this stance was repealed after subsequent alliances with Islamists and leftists.

The founder of the Liberal Egyptian party was Mahmoud El Pher'oni, from the Assiut Governorate.

Ideas and goals 
 The application of a liberal democracy in Egypt.
 Complete secularization and religious neutrality on a political level.
 The reassertion of the Egyptian identity separate from the pan-Arab identity.
 Recognizing Masri (the colloquial language of the Egyptian people) as the official language of Egypt.
 Reviving the Egyptian language.
 Complete religious freedom and protecting the rights of religious minorities to practice their own faith.
 Removing the authority of religious scholars to affect political decisions under the pretext of Sharia law.
 Ensuring that freedom of opinion, expression and belief extends to all members of Egyptian society.

See also 
 List of political parties in Egypt
 Liberalism in Egypt
 Politics of Egypt

References

2003 establishments in Egypt
2011 disestablishments in Egypt
Political parties established in 2003
Political parties disestablished in 2011
Defunct political parties in Egypt
Egyptian nationalist parties
Language revival
Liberal parties in Egypt
Secularism in Egypt
Pharaonism